"The Game of Love" is a song by American rock band Santana from their 18th studio album, Shaman (2002). The vocal performance on the song is by Michelle Branch. It was composed by Gregg Alexander (as Alex Ander) and Rick Nowels. The song was released as a single on September 23, 2002, and won a Grammy Award for "Best Pop Collaboration with Vocals", as well as peaking at number five on the Billboard Hot 100 singles chart. The song also reached the top 10 in Canada, New Zealand, and six European countries.

Background
The song had originally been recorded with New Radicals frontman Gregg Alexander, but album producer Clive Davis felt a female voice would maximize the song's appeal and a recording of Santana performing "The Game of Love" with Tina Turner as vocalist was completed. When Turner declined to participate in making a video for the track, Davis recruited Macy Gray to record a replacement vocal. When Davis was not satisfied with that version, Michelle Branch was asked to record the song, with Branch's rhythm guitar playing also added to the track. Branch said, "It was the first time for me to sing somebody else's song. Usually I'm like: 'Oh I want it this way' and I'm in charge...I didn't meet [Carlos Santana at the recording session], I didn't know what was going on...It felt to me like wow it seems like there's so much at stake, I'm going to go in there and just sing my heart out and just cross my fingers."

The Tina Turner version of "The Game of Love" was issued on the 2007 retrospective Ultimate Santana. Santana said "There's only one Tina Turner...No one can hit a note like Tina Turner...I love Michelle [Branch] and she did a great interpretation of it. It's just that with all honor and respect to Michelle, there's the girl and there's the woman, and Michelle is unfolding into a woman...but it takes time to go from a girl into a woman."

Chart performance
"The Game of Love" peaked at number five on the US Billboard Hot 100 on the week ending November 30, 2002. The song stayed on the charts for 37 weeks. The song became Branch's second top-10 hit, as well as her first-highest-peaking single, after "All You Wanted" and "Everywhere".

Music video
The music video depicts Santana and Branch in an alley with couples around them, each expressing their love for one another. The director was Paul Fedor and the video was filmed in the Pilsen neighborhood of Chicago, with cameo appearances by Wesley Snipes, Helen Hunt and Jennifer Garner.

Track listings
US CD single
 "The Game of Love" (radio mix) – 4:18
 "The Game of Love" (instrumental) – 4:18

European CD and cassette single
 "The Game of Love" (radio mix) – 4:18
 "Come to My World" – 4:11

European and Australian maxi-CD single
 "The Game of Love" (radio mix) – 4:18
 "Come to My World" – 4:11
 "Curacion" – 4:47
 "The Game of Love" (video)

Credits and personnel
Credits are taken from the European CD single liner notes.

Studio
 Mixed at Larrabee North Studios (North Hollywood, California, US)
 Engineered at the Big Space (Santa Monica, California, US) and Fantasy Studios (Berkeley, California, US)

Personnel

 Alex Ander – writing, production
 Rick Nowels – writing, background vocals, acoustic guitar, keyboards, production
 Carlos Santana – lead guitar, horn arrangements, album production
 Michelle Branch – lead vocals, background vocals
 Andy Vargas – additional vocals
 Tony Lindsay – additional vocals
 Niki Haris – background vocals
 Siedah Garrett – background vocals
 Rusty Anderson – additional electric guitar
 Chester Thompson – piano, organ
 Benny Rietveld – bass
 Brian Collier – drums
 Wayne Rodrigues – drum programming
 Raul Rekow – congas
 Karl Perazzo – percussion
 Louis Conte – additional percussion
 Bill Ortiz – trumpet, horn arrangements
 Julius Melendez – trumpet
 Jeff Cressman – trombone, horn arrangements
 Martin Wehner – trombone
 Ben Conrad – engineering
 Chris Garcia – engineering
 Randy Wine – engineering
 Greg Collins – engineering
 Michael Rosen – engineering
 Scott Holderby – engineering
 Eddie Kramer – engineering
 Tone – engineering
 Kieron Menzies – engineering assistant
 Alan Veucosovic – engineering assistant
 Manny Marroquin – mixing
 Kirstin Johnson – project coordination for Ander and Nowels
 Robert Cappadona – project coordination for Ander and Nowels
 Clive Davis – album production
 Antonio "LA" Reid – executive production

Charts

Weekly charts

Year-end charts

Release history

See also
 List of Billboard Adult Contemporary number ones of 2003

References

2002 singles
2002 songs
Arista Records singles
Bertelsmann Music Group singles
Grammy Award for Best Pop Collaboration with Vocals
Gregg Alexander songs
Maverick Records singles
Michelle Branch songs
Santana (band) songs
Song recordings produced by Gregg Alexander
Song recordings produced by Rick Nowels
Songs written by Gregg Alexander
Songs written by Rick Nowels